Griseargiolestes intermedius is a species of Australian damselfly in the family Megapodagrionidae,
commonly known as an alpine flatwing. 
It is endemic to alpine areas of Victoria and New South Wales, where it inhabits bogs and seepages.

Griseargiolestes intermedius is a medium-sized damselfly, black-green metallic in colour with pale markings; adults are slightly pruinescent.
Like other members of the family Megapodagrionidae it rests with its wings outspread.

Griseargiolestes intermedius appears similar to Griseargiolestes griseus, which occurs further north into New South Wales.

Gallery

See also
 List of Odonata species of Australia

References 

Megapodagrionidae
Odonata of Australia
Insects of Australia
Endemic fauna of Australia
Taxa named by Robert John Tillyard
Insects described in 1913
Damselflies